Fort George G. Meade is a United States Army installation located in Maryland, that includes the Defense Information School, the Defense Media Activity, the United States Army Field Band, and the headquarters of United States Cyber Command, the National Security Agency, the Defense Courier Service, Defense Information Systems Agency headquarters, and the U.S. Navy's Cryptologic Warfare Group Six. It is named for George G. Meade, a Union general from the U.S. Civil War, who served as commander of the Army of the Potomac. The fort's smaller census-designated place includes support facilities such as schools, housing, and the offices of the Military Intelligence Civilian Excepted Career Program (MICECP).

History

Initially called Camp Annapolis Junction, the post was opened as "Camp Admiral" in 1917 on  acquired for a training camp. The post was called Camp Meade Cantonment by 1918, Camp Franklin Signal Corps school was located there and in 1919, the Camp Benning tank school—formed from the World War I Camp Colt and Tobyhanna schools—was transferred to the fort before the Tank Corps was disbanded.

Renamed to Fort Leonard Wood (February 1928 – March 5, 1929), the fort's Experimental Motorized Forces in the summer and fall of 1928 tested vehicles and tactics in expedition convoys (Camp Meade observers had joined the in-progress 1919 Motor Transport Corps convoy). In 1929, the fort's 1st Tank Regiment encamped on the Gettysburg Battlefield.

During World War II, Fort Meade was used as a recruit training post and prisoner of war camp, in addition to a holding center for approximately 384 Japanese, German, and Italian immigrant residents of the U.S. arrested as potential fifth columnists. The Second U.S. Army Headquarters transferred to the post on June 15, 1947; and in 1957, the post became headquarters of the National Security Agency.

Cold War air defense
From the 1950s until the 1970s, the Fort Meade radar station had various radar equipment and control systems for air defense (e.g., the 1st Martin AN/FSG-I Antiaircraft Defense System).  Fort Meade also had the first Nike Ajax surface-to-air missiles in December 1953 (operational May 1954) and an accidental firing occurred in 1955 with Battery C, 36th AAA Missile Battalion. In 1962, the Army's Headquarters and Headquarters Battery, 13th Air Defense Artillery Group, transferred from Meade to Homestead AFB for initial deployment of MIM-23 Hawk missiles, and during the Cuban Missile Crisis, the 6th Battalion (HAWK), 65th Artillery at Fort Meade (a United States Strike Command unit) was deployed to the Miami/Key West area (the 8th Battalion (Hawk) was at the fort in late 1964). Fort Meade bomb disposal experts were dispatched to secure nuclear bombs in the 1964 Savage Mountain B-52 crash.

Expansion
In 1977, a merger organized the fort's U.S. Army Intelligence Agency as part of the United States Army Intelligence and Security Command. On 1 October 1991, a wing of the Air Force Intelligence Command transferred to Fort Meade, and the organization was replaced by the 70th Operations Group on May 1, 2005.  In the early 1990s,  was transferred from the post to the Patuxent Research Refuge. A planned closure of the post in the 1990s was not implemented, and the Defense Information School moved to the fort in 1995. The 311th Signal Command headquarters was at Fort Meade from 1996 – September 2006.  The 70th Intelligence Wing headquarters was established at Fort Meade on July 17, 2000, and the Base Realignment and Closure, 2005, designated Fort Meade to gain 5,700 positions. Fort Meade currently has more than 54,000 employees (service members and civilians), and is the largest employer in the state of Maryland and second largest installation by employee population in the Army.

Hazardous waste
After an August 27, 2007, U.S. Environmental Protection Agency order to assess the contamination at 14 hazardous waste sites on Fort Meade (e.g., ordnance disposal area, 1940s waste dump, closed sanitary landfill), a September 2007 environmental impact report identified adding two golf courses would be a "significant threat to the biological and territorial integrity of the Patuxent Research Refuge". The US Army responded that it is "taking steps to limit the environmental damage."

Defense Information Systems Agency

Defense Information School
The consolidation of the Defense Information School and the Defense Visual Information School in fiscal 1996 and further consolidation with the Defense Photography School in fiscal 1998 created a single focal point in the Department of Defense for these specialties fields. Advancements in information technology and recent base realignment and closure initiatives have contributed to the evolution of the school. The result is a single school proud of its historical roots and dedicated to serving the diverse requirements for public affairs, broadcasting and visual information.

Security incidents
Alleged gunman Hong Young was arrested in connection with shootings at five public places in Maryland, including an NSA building, theaters and occupied vehicles in late February 2015. No motive has been established but his estranged wife attributed his behavior to mental issues, and he told police he heard voices telling him to shoot at a random driver.

On March 30, 2015, National Security Agency police officers shot and killed a person who attempted to drive an SUV through a restricted entrance to the NSA campus in Fort Meade, Maryland. A passenger in the SUV was injured, as was an officer, and both were treated at a hospital. President Obama was briefed but the FBI determined "we do not believe it is related to terrorism."

On February 14, 2018, National Security Agency police officers shot and wounded an individual who rammed an SUV into a barricade near an entry gate outside of the facility. In the immediate aftermath of the event, the NSA announced that there was "no ongoing security or safety threat."

Geography
It is located between Washington, D.C. and Baltimore. It is located in proximity to Odenton, Columbia, Jessup, Hanover, Laurel, and Severn.

Based units 
Notable military and government units based at Fort George G. Meade.

United States Army 
United States Army Civil Affairs & Psychological Operations Command (Airborne)

 352nd Civil Affairs Command
United States Army Corps of Engineers

 North Atlantic Division
 Baltimore District
 Bay Area Office

United States Army Criminal Investigation Command

 68th Military Police Detachment (CID)

United States Army Forces Command

 First Army Division East
 72nd Field Artillery Brigade
 3rd Training Support Battalion

United States Army Intelligence & Security Command

 704th Military Intelligence Brigade
 Headquarters and Headquarters Company
 741st Military Intelligence Battalion
 742nd Military Intelligence Battalion (Network Warfare)
 780th Military Intelligence Brigade
 Headquarters and Headquarters Company
 781st Military Intelligence Battalion
 902nd Military Intelligence Group
 Headquarters and Headquarters Detachment
 308th Military Intelligence Battalion

United States Army Recruiting Command

 1st Recruiting Brigade
 Medical Recruiting Brigade
 1st Medical Recruiting Battalion

United States Army Reserve

 48th Combat Support Hospital
 200th Military Police Command

United States Army Training and Doctrine Command

 Asymmetric Warfare Group

Maryland Army National Guard

 32nd Civil Support Team

Other
 241st Military Police Detachment
 55th Signal Company (Combat Camera)
 Army Audit Agency
 Army Public Affairs Center
 Forensic Toxicology Drug Testing Laboratory
 US Army Field Band

United States Marines 
Marine Corps Cyberspace Command

 Headquarters Marine Corps Cyberspace Command

Marine Corps Intelligence

 Marine Cryptologic Support Battalion
 Headquarters Marine Cryptologic Support Battalion
 Company B
 Company L

United States Air Force 
Air Combat Command

 Sixteenth Air Force
 70th Intelligence, Surveillance and Reconnaissance Wing
 Headquarters 70th Intelligence, Surveillance and Reconnaissance Wing
 70th Operations Support Squadron
 659th Intelligence, Surveillance, and Reconnaissance Group
 7th Intelligence Squadron
 41st Intelligence Squadron
 691st Intelligence, Surveillance, and Reconnaissance Group
 22nd Intelligence Squadron
 29th Intelligence Squadron
 34th Intelligence Squadron
 707th Intelligence, Surveillance, and Reconnaissance Group
 32nd Intelligence Squadron
 94th Intelligence Squadron
 707th Communications Squadron
 707th Force Support Squadron

Air Force Reserve Command

 Tenth Air Force
 655th Intelligence, Surveillance and Reconnaissance Wing
 655th Intelligence, Surveillance and Reconnaissance Group
 16th Intelligence Squadron
 512th Intelligence Squadron

United States Navy 
United States Fleet Cyber Command (United States Tenth Fleet)

 Cryptologic Warfare Group Six

Department of Defense 
Defense Counterintelligence and Security Agency

 Consolidated Adjudications Facility

Defense Information Systems Agency

 Headquarters Defense Information Systems Agency

Defense Media Activity

 Headquarters Defense Media Activity
 Defense Information School
United States Cyber Command

 Headquarters United States Cyber Command

United States Transportation Command

 Defense Courier Service
 Defense Courier Station, Baltimore

United States Department of the Navy 
Naval Criminal Investigative Service

 Department of the Navy Central Adjudication Facility

United States Environmental Protection Agency 

 Environmental Science Center

Library of Congress 

 Book Storage Facility

National Security Agency 

 Headquarters National Security Agency

Library of Congress
Fort Meade is used as a storage facility for the United States Library of Congress.

In 1994, a  site located in the U.S. Army Base at Fort Meade, MD was transferred to the U.S. Congress to provide additional storage capacity for the Library of Congress and other legislative bodies. The current master plan includes the land to construct up to 13 Phased Storage Modules for collections, if this number is needed.

In subsequent years, Congress provided construction funds in the Architect of the Capitol budget for Module 1, completed in 2002, for Module 2, completed in 2005 and Modules 3 and 4 and four cold storage rooms, completed in 2009.  A full-scale three-year transfer program of the special format collections to Modules 3 and 4 and the four cold storage rooms began in Spring 2010 and was completed in September 2012.  Module 5 has been fully funded with occupancy scheduled for September 2017.

The state-of-the art storage modules are being built to store, preserve and protect the library's collections. Collections include books and bound periodicals as well as special format collections, such as maps, manuscripts, prints, photographs, sheet music, and microfilm masters. If needed and constructed, the 13 collections storage modules will provide a total of 180,600 gross sq ft of archival storage space for the library's collections.

Museums

The Fort George G. Meade Museum exhibited the post's historical artifacts, including uniforms, insignia, and equipment. The museum also had a small collection of vehicles, including a Renault FT, a MK VIII Liberty Tank, an M3A1 Stuart, an M4A3E8 Sherman, an M41 Walker Bulldog, an M47 Patton, armored personnel carriers such as an M113, M114, M84, a Nike Ajax missile, and a UH-1H helicopter. The Fort George G. Meade Community Council noted in July 2018 that the museum would close, with artifacts relocated to the National Museum of the United States Army under construction in Fort Belvoir, Virginia.

Transportation
Since 2005, the NSA operates a shuttle service from the Odenton station of MARC to its Visitor Control Center at Fort Meade. In 2009, the U.S. Army established a similar shuttle service from the Odenton station to the Army section of Fort Meade; the NSA operates this service, allowing garrison employees, persons with Fort Meade visitor passes, and U.S. Department of Defense IDs to board.

Housing concerns
In February 2019, Secretary of the Army Mark Esper, Chief of Staff Mark Milley, and Sgt. Maj. of the Army Daniel A. Dailey met with the commander of IMCOM, the Fort Meade garrison commander, and Army families over safety concerns with housing units on the base in which residents were exposed to lead and asbestos. After speaking with the CEO for the company which manages the house maintenance of the installation, the senior leaders of the Army will determine necessary actions. "We are deeply troubled by the recent reports highlighting the deficient conditions in some of our family housing. It is unacceptable for our families who sacrifice so much to have to endure these hardships in their own homes."—Secretary of the Army, Dr. Mark T. Esper and Chief of Staff of the Army, Gen. Mark A. Milley

Gallery

See also 

 List of United States military bases

References

External links

Fort Meade Alliance

Meade
Buildings and structures in Anne Arundel County, Maryland
Meade
Military Superfund sites
National Security Agency facilities
Superfund sites in Maryland
M
Meade
Intelligence agency headquarters